Pedamadaka is a neighbourhood in the city of Visakhapatnam, state of Andhra Pradesh, India. It is a suburb of the city.

About
It is on the South side of city in Parawada mandal .

References

Neighbourhoods in Visakhapatnam